Gabriel Babatunde Ogunmola is a Nigerian Professor of Chemistry and Chancellor of Lead City University, Ibadan.

Education and career
Professor Ogunmola obtained a bachelor and doctorate in chemistry from the University of Ibadan in 1965 and 1968 respectively.
In July 1968, he joined the department of Chemistry, University of Ibadan as a postdoctoral research fellow and in 1969, he left the UI to join the University of Pennsylvania as a postdoctoral research fellow at Johnson Research Foundation, Department of Biophysics and Medical Physics.
In 1970, he returned to the University of Ibadan as an academic staff in the department of chemistry, where he became a full professor in 1980 and in 1983, he was appointed, Dean, Faculty of Science, Olabisi Onabanjo University, the then Ogun State University.
In 1981, he was elected as fellow of the Nigerian Academy of Science and in January 2003, he was elected president of the Nigerian Academy of Science to succeeded Professor Alexander Animalu.
In 2005, he retired from the University of Ibadan and in 2004, prior to his retirement, he was appointed as member, Honorary Presidential Advisory Council on Science and Technology to the President of Nigeria.

References 

Living people
University of Ibadan alumni
Academic staff of the University of Ibadan
Fellows of the Nigerian Academy of Science
Academic staff of Lead City University
Nigerian expatriate academics in the United States
University of Pennsylvania faculty
Academic staff of Olabisi Onabanjo University
Nigerian chemists
People from Oyo State
Year of birth missing (living people)